Coma is a 2020 Russian science fiction action film directed by Nikita Argunov. It was released on January 30, 2020 by Central Partnership.

Cast
 Rinal Mukhametov as Viktor / The Architect
 Lyubov Aksyonova as "Fly"
 Anton Pampushnyy as "Phantom"
 Milos Bikovic as "Astronomer"
 Konstantin Lavronenko as Yan
 Polina Kuzminskaya as "Spirit"
 Rostislav Gulbis as "Gnome"
 Vilen Babichev as "Tank"
 Leonid Timtsunik as "Kabel"

References

External links 
 

2020s Russian-language films
2020 science fiction action films
2020s fantasy action films
2020 action adventure films
Russian science fiction action films
Russian fantasy action films
Dark fantasy films
Russian action adventure films
Films about architecture
Science fantasy films
Russian dark fantasy films